Diki Chhyoling Gumba (Nepali: दिकि छ्योलिङ्ग गुम्बा) is a Buddhist monastery located in Olangchungola, Taplejung District of Nepal. It was built in the 16th century CE. The  monastery houses a life size statue of Avalokiteshwara. A butter lamp kept near the altar is believed to be burning uninterrupted since the construction of the gompa. The monastery also houses historical and cultural scriptures, idols, paintings related to Buddhism. The monastery was renovated in 1860.

See also
List of monastery in Nepal

References

Buddhist monasteries in Nepal
16th-century establishments in Nepal
Buildings and structures in Taplejung District